The women's 1000 metres race of the 2014–15 ISU Speed Skating World Cup 7, arranged in the Gunda Niemann-Stirnemann-Halle in Erfurt, Germany, was held on 22 March 2015.

Result
The race took place on Sunday, 22 March, scheduled in the afternoon session, at 15:13.

References

Women 1000
7